There are approximately thirteen nationally recognized public holidays celebrated in the Republic of Zambia, a country in Southern Africa.

If a public holiday falls on a Sunday, the following Monday will be observed as a holiday.

On the Easter weekend, all four days are declared public holidays.

Public holidays

January 1 - New Years Day
March 8 - International Women's Day
March 12 - Youth Day
April 28 - Birthday of Kenneth Kaunda
May 1 - Labour Day
May 25 - Africa Day
July (first Monday) - Heroes' Day
July (Tuesday following Heroes' Day) - Unity Day
August (first Monday) - Farmers' Day
October 18 - National Prayer Day
October 24 - Independence Day
December 25 - Christmas Day

References

External links
http://www.worldtravelguide.net/zambia/public-holidays
http://www.parliament.gov.zm/sites/default/files/documents/acts/Public%20Holidays%20Act.pdf

 
Zambian culture
Events in Zambia
Zambia